Dylan Giffen (born January 2, 1997) is a professional Canadian football offensive lineman for the Toronto Argonauts of the Canadian Football League (CFL).

University career
Giffen played for the Western Mustangs of U Sports football from 2015 to 2019. He used a redshirt season in 2015 and then went on to play in 26 games for the team over four years. He won a Vanier Cup championship in 2017 after the Mustangs defeated the Laval Rouge et Or in the 53rd Vanier Cup. He started at left tackle in his final two years with the Mustangs where he was named a First Team OUA All-Star in both years.

Professional career
Giffen was drafted in the third round, 28th overall, in the 2020 CFL Draft by the Toronto Argonauts, but did not play in 2020 due to the cancellation of the 2020 CFL season. He then signed with the team on May 13, 2021. He made the team's active roster following training camp and played in his first career professional game on August 7, 2021, against the Calgary Stampeders. He later made his first career start on September 24, 2021 against the Montreal Alouettes at left guard. He played in 12 regular season games for the Argonauts during his rookie season while spending the other two games on the team's injured list.

References

External links
Toronto Argonauts bio 

1997 births
Living people
Canadian football offensive linemen
People from Strathroy-Caradoc
Players of Canadian football from Ontario
Toronto Argonauts players
Western Mustangs football players